The Lakes Connection 555 is a bus route operated by Stagecoach Cumbria & North Lancashire in Cumbria and Lancashire, England.

Route
Route 555 starts from Lancaster in the northern part of Lancashire. The route goes via Carnforth, into Cumbria through Milnthorpe and past Levens Hall before stopping at Kendal bus station. Some summer journeys run between Lancaster and Kendal via more direct route mainly via the M6 Motorway.

After a break, the route generally follows the A591 road into the Lake District. The route goes through Staveley, the town of Windermere and alongside the lake of Windermere to Ambleside. The route then continues into and out of the village of Grasmere, passing the lakes Rydal Water, Grasmere and Thirlmere before arriving at Keswick near to Derwent Water.

Previously the route used to extend a further 30 miles from Keswick north to Carlisle. It was split with Stagecoach route 554 now connects with route 555 at Keswick bus station.

Current route
Route 555 operates via these primary locations:

Vehicles
In October 2011, Stagecoach introduced nine Alexander Dennis Enviro 400 bodied Scania N230UD buses to operate the route.

These buses had a special livery and carried "555 Freedom of the Lakes" branding. Each bus was named after a famous Lake District mountain. 

The names (and bus fleet numbers) were:

In July 2016, twelve Alexander Dennis Enviro400 MMC buses were introduced.

Tourism
The bus service is popular with tourists as they can see the countryside from the top deck. The route is also popular with walkers. Robert Swain authored a book, "55 555 Walks", that shows walks that could be done from destinations along the whole route in both Lancashire and Cumbria.

Ladies That Bus 
The play Ladies That Bus was written by Joyce Branagh and based on 400 interviews with users of the 555 route. It was developed in association with the three theatres along the route: The Dukes in  Lancaster, the Brewery Arts Centre in Kendal and Theatre by the Lake, Keswick. The show toured in early 2020 before the lockdown caused by the COVID-19 pandemic, and was scheduled to open on 29 September 2020 as one of the first productions at The Dukes   as restrictions eased. In January 2021 the Dukes theatre made Ladies That Bus available online through Vimeo, as a response to the lockdown conditions.

Notes

References

External links
Stagecoach 555 - Go Lakes

Bus routes in England
Stagecoach Group
Transport in Cumbria